Catamarca may refer to:

San Fernando del Valle de Catamarca, Argentina
Catamarca Province, Argentina

See also
Cajamarca (disambiguation)